Virgin Spring Cinefest (VSC) is an IMDb Award listing International Film Festival. It is an annual major award screening event that takes place in Kolkata and features art-house films from across the world. The event was started in 2017. The festival has been named in honour of Ingmar Bergman’s classic film "Virgin Spring".

Each month, the most representatives of monthly award winners are screened in Kolkata, and reviewed by CULT CRITIC film magazine. All the monthly winners compete for the GOLDEN GALAXY AWARD (Best film of the year). The annual winners are accredited with trophy, certificate and laurel.

Notable Awardees 
The award is given out each year for significant movies and people in a variety of categories

2022 
Omar Cook best actor for "Deadly Thoughts"
Bai Ling for "Jack Be Nimble"
 Dennaa, The Wings 2022
Kunal Sanjay Mehra for his song "Lambi Si Sadak" 2022
Tentacle Head 2022
Ankuran 2022
Suujoy J. Mukerji's "Ab Mujhe Udnaa Hai" 2022

2021 
Frazer Lee for short film "The Stay"
Steve Bastoni best actor for his film "The Widow"
Daniela Farinacci best actress for her film "The Widow"
Pierre Yves Lenik best original score for "Contumace" by Nelson Rodrigo
Nabarun Bose Best Music Score (Silver Award) for "Three Hours in Grayscale"

2020 
Ronnie Cramer Gold Award for Animated Film
Tak Tak 2020
"Ankuran, The Art of Idol Making" 2020
Flora Saini for "Motherland" 2020
Deepak Dobriyal's "Kacche Din" 2020
Terry Blade Gold Award for Music Video "Mr. Robertson"

2019 
James P Mahon for best Mobile Film, "A Global Mobile Journalism Journey"
 Simonna Silver Award for Best Short Film "Robot Romance"
 Kara Petersen Gold Award for Mobile Film "Donna On the Go"
"Aaradi" 2019
‘Paintings in the Dark’ 2019
"One year on – The Essex lorry tragedy" 2019

2018 
"From a Barren State" 2018
‘Main Kaun Hoon’ (Who Am I) 2018, Golden Galaxy Award
‘Faagun’ 2018, Silver Award

2017 
Adhura 2017 Bronze Award
"Far but near", a film by Massimiliano Tedeschi

References 

Film festivals established in 2017
Film festivals in India
Culture of Kolkata
2017 establishments in West Bengal
Events in Kolkata